William McDonald is an American journalist and editor for The New York Times and is the current obituaries editor.

McDonald, a former editor at Newsday on Long Island, joined the New York Times in 1988 and has held numerous positions at the paper. He was the copy chief of the national news desk, assistant national editor, deputy editor of Arts & Leisure and deputy culture editor. He was part of the team that won the Pulitzer Prize for National Reporting in 2000 for the series, How Race Is Lived in America. He has been the obituaries editor since February 2006. He grew up in Stratford, Connecticut, and earned degrees at Fairfield University in Connecticut and Syracuse University in New York. He is married and lives in Manhattan.

References

External links
 

The New York Times writers
Obituary writers
Year of birth missing (living people)
Living people
Fairfield University alumni
Syracuse University alumni
People from Stratford, Connecticut